The following is a list of Lehigh Mountain Hawks men's basketball head coaches. There have been 27 head coaches of the Mountain Hawks in their 122-season history.

Lehigh's current head coach is Brett Reed. He was hired as the Mountain Hawks' head coach in August 2007, replacing Billy Taylor, who left to become the head coach at Ball State.

References

Lehigh

Lehigh Mountain Hawks basketball, men's, coaches